The Diwangkara's long-tailed giant rat (Leopoldamys diwangkarai) is a species of rodent in the family Muridae. It is found in the Indonesian regions of Kalimantan and Java.

References

Mammals described in 2008
Mammals of Indonesia